Pio Abelgas Kabahar (October 11, 1892 – March 7,1977), also known as Piux A. Kabahar, was a Cebuano composer, playwright, journalist, and director. He was best known as a playwright, he was the director of the first Cebuano moving picture, Bertoldo ug Balodoy.

Early life 
Pio Kabahar was born to the couple Justo Kabahar and Margarita Abelgas in San Nicolas, Cebu on October 11, 1892. He was influenced by his father who was a musician, and he played violin for the Mauricia Gahuman's dancing hall, as well as other musical instruments such as the mandolin, guitar, cello, banjo, bandurria, kubing, and percussions. When he had saved enough, he paid for his studies at the Cebu Provincial High School.

Career 
He first taught at Recoleto Central School for four years and then became a writer. His time saw the emergence of the press that regularly published works of the local artist, whose styles were imitations of American novels and influenced by the translations of European fiction. Kabahar's works in stage drama exhibited similar shift, added with social criticism and entertainment as evident in the works of other playwrights such as Buenaventura Rodriguez and Florentino Borromeo.

Stage plays 
Later, he became a playwright, particularly of zarzuelas. The music of his zarzuelas were his own composition as well as the compositions of Manuel Velez, Jose Estella, and Pidong Villaflor. In addition, he also directed his plays and the works of his contemporaries including Buenaventura Rodriguez, Jacinto Alcor, and Fernando Alfon. He also wrote the Rosas Pandan.

In 1935, he co-founded Cebu Musical Dramatic Art Studio together with Fernando Alfon and Vicente Castillo. The organization's aim was to develop the arts in Cebu.

Kabahar's stages plays were influenced by Rodriguez, with the distinction that Kabahar wrote comedy while Rodriguez wrote reflective drama. Gugma sa Inahan (Mother's Love) was considered the best among his works that featured themes of national independence and criticism on the effects of colonization.

Director 
Kabahar was the writer and director of the first Cebuano moving picture, Bertoldo ug Balodoy in 1939 and Rosas Pandan.

Journalism 
Aside from writing and directing, he also edited Cebuano section of the periodicals La Revolucion, La Solidaridad, El Espectador, and The Advertiser. He was editor in chief of the following publications: Ang Bandila, Ang Buhat, Ang Sidlakan, and The Freeman, as well as publisher of the newspapers Ang Katarungan, Juan dela Cruz, El Espectador, Nasud, The Freeman, and Ang Tigmantala.

His column in The Freeman entitled Katawa (Laughter) was a popular humorous section of the periodical in the late 1920s, which formed part of the Bertoldo ug Balodoy that he would create years later.

Cebu municipal board 
Kabahar also served as secretary to the Municipal Board of Cebu and became member of the council from 1932 until 1962.

Later years 
He was awarded Rizal Pro Patria Award on June 19, 1961. He died on March 7, 1977, a largely forgotten man.

Historical commemoration 

 A street in Guadalupe, Cebu City was named in his honor.

Works

Zarzuelas 

 Nagun-uba sa Lan- git (1917)
 Ang Ismirismis (1919)
 Hm! (1919)
 Alaut(1919)
 Fe, Esperanza, Caridad (1920)
 Fifi (1929)
 Gugma sa Inahan (1933) 
 Mr ug Mrs (1940)

Plays 

 Limbong ni Tintay (1916)
 Miss Dolying (1920) 
 Kasingkasing (1921) 
 Aling Pulana (1923)
 Santo Papa (1931)
 Sinakit (1933)
 Tulo Ka Adlaw sa Langit (1933)

Films 

 Bertoldo ug Balodoy (1939)
 Rosas Pandan

Further reading 

 Studies in pre-war Sugbuanon theatre: the first series, Office of the Vice Chancellor for Research and Development, University of the Philippines (2001).
 Ramas, Wilhelmina. Sugbuanon Theatre from Sotto to Rodriguez and Kabahar: An Introduction to Pre-war Sugbuanon Drama, University of California (2008)

References 

20th-century Filipino writers
Filipino city and municipal councilors
Filipino columnists
Filipino newspaper editors
Filipino theatre directors
1892 births
Writers from Cebu
Filipino dramatists and playwrights
Filipino film directors
Year of death missing
20th-century Filipino politicians